Seven of Coins is a card used in Latin suited playing cards which include tarot decks. It is part of what tarot card readers call the "Minor Arcana".

Tarot cards are used throughout much of Europe to play tarot card games.

In English-speaking countries, where the games are largely unknown, Tarot cards came to be utilized primarily for divinatory purposes.

Divination usage

The Seven of Pentacles (Coins) often means movement. This could be moving house or moving up in your career.

Common Interpretation

The Seven of Coins, or The Seven of Pentacles, is a card which when upright means to show your commitment towards your work life or dreams. It may seem like charity work to you, but it is on the value of receiving emotional and spiritual rewards, like the saying 'success is a journey, not a destination'.

The reversed meaning of the card means excess energy and personal resources used that can cause a strain, the feeling of giving too much of your time and resources with little reward or assurance of moving forward. The advice of the card is to re-assess your commitment levels. If for too long you are not receiving the results you desire, it may be best to cut your losses, especially when it seems to be a bad investment of your time and money.

In popular culture

In her poem The Seven of Pentacles, Marge Piercy writes:

References

Suit of Coins